Bram Franken (born 14 February 2001) is a Dutch professional footballer who plays as a midfielder for Tweede Divisie club Quick Boys.

Club career
Franken made his professional debut with Jong AZ in a 3–0 Eerste Divisie loss to FC Den Bosch on 31 January 2020. On 24 April 2020, he signed a contract keeping him with Jong AZ until 2022.

Honours

Netherlands U17
 UEFA European Under-17 Championship: 2018

References

External links
 
 Ons Oranje U17 Profile
 Ons Oranje U18 Profile

2001 births
Living people
Footballers from Amsterdam
Dutch footballers
Netherlands youth international footballers
Association football midfielders
Jong AZ players
Quick Boys players
Eerste Divisie players
Tweede Divisie players